The Confederation of Workers of Colombia (Spanish: Confederación de Trabajadores de Colombia, CTC) is a trade union centre in Colombia. It was formed in 1936, and is affiliated to the International Trade Union Confederation.

In 1976 José Raquel Mercado, a former president of CTC, was assassinated by the M-19 movement.

References

Trade unions in Colombia
International Trade Union Confederation
Trade unions established in 1936